The Guianan red cotinga (Phoenicircus carnifex) is a species of bird in the family Cotingidae, the cotingas. It is one of two species in the genus Phoenicircus.

It is found in northeastern South America in the Guianas in Guyana, Suriname and French Guiana; also a small border region of adjacent eastern Venezuela. In Brazil the species is found in the lower Amazon Basin bordering the Guyanas at the Amazon River outlet, and only ranges upstream in the Brazilian states of Pará, and Amapá. It is found on Marajó Island and southwards into northeastern Pará.

Its natural habitat is subtropical or tropical moist lowland forests.

There is a minor intersecting of the Guianan red cotinga range with the only other species in Phoenicircus, the black-necked red cotinga.

Taxonomy
In 1743 the English naturalist George Edwards included an illustration and a description of the Guianan red cotinga in the first volume of his A Natural History of Uncommon Birds. He used the English name "The Red Bird from Surinam". Edwards based his hand-coloured etching on a specimen in the collection of the Duke of Richmond. When in 1758 the Swedish naturalist Carl Linnaeus updated his Systema Naturae for the tenth edition, he placed the Guianan red cotinga with the shrikes in the genus Lanius. Linnaeus included a brief description, coined the binomial name Lanius carnifex and cited Edwards' work. The Guianan red cotinga is now placed in the genus Phoenicircus that was introduced in 1832 by the English naturalist William John Swainson. The genus name combines the Ancient Greek phoinikeos meaning "crimson" or "dark red" with kerkos meaning "tail". The specific epithet carnifex is Latin meaning "executioner" or "murderer". The species is monotypic: no subspecies are recognised.

References

External links
Guianan red cotinga videos on the Internet Bird Collection
Stamps (for Suriname) with RangeMap
Photo; Article planktonik.com
Photo-High Res ; Article  www.mnh.si.edu—"Biological Diversity of the Guiana Shield"
Graphic-"Red Cotinga"; Article montereybay–Best Birds of the World

Guianan red cotinga
Birds of the Brazilian Amazon
Birds of the Guianas
Guianan red cotinga
Guianan red cotinga
Taxonomy articles created by Polbot